NMDS may refer to:

 National Minimum Data Set for Social Care
  non-metric multidimensional scaling
 Nursing Minimum Data Set
 New Mexican Disaster Squad